The 1951–52 La Liga was the 21st season since its establishment. The season started on 9 September 1951 and finished on 13 April 1952. Barcelona achieved their fifth title.

Team locations

Las Palmas and Atlético Tetuán made their debut in La Liga. The former became the first team from the Canary Islands to play in the top tier while the latter, as Tetouan were part of the Spanish protectorate in Morocco, were the first team based in the continental Africa to play in a European top division.

League table

Results

Relegation group

Standings

Results

Top scorers

References
LA LIGA 1951/1952
Futbolme.com
All rounds in La Liga 1951/52
List of La Liga Champions

External links
 Official LFP Site

La Liga seasons
1951–52 in Spanish football leagues
Spain